On 10 November 2002, an attack in Metzer resulted in the death of five residents.

Attack
Sirhan entered the Kibbutz of Metzer on November 10th and fatally shot 5 residents, including two children. Additionally, the Al Aqsa Martyrs Brigades claim to have been responsible for the attack.

Victims

The attacker murdered filmmaker Revital Ohayoun, 34, and her two young children (Matan, 5, and Noam, 4), who were killed in their beds. Additionally, Tirza Damari, 42, and Yitzhak Drori, 44, the kibbutz secretary, were shot while responding to the gunfire.

Perpetrator
Sirhan Sirhan (Arabic: سرحان سرحان, died 2003) was identified as the perpetrator. He was reportedly a member of Tanzim, an armed wing of Fatah. 

Despite initial claims to the contrary, he was not related to Sirhan Sirhan, the Palestinian American Christian who assassinated United States Senator Robert F. Kennedy in 1968.

His house was demolished on December 19, 2002, by the Israel Defense Forces (IDF). On October 3, 2003, Sirhan was killed by Yamam, an IDF counter-terrorism unit, during an attempt to arrest him.

See also
2011 Itamar attack
List of people with reduplicated names

References

External links
Victims of Palestinian Violence and Terrorism since September 2000 at The Israeli Ministry of Foreign Affairs
Fatal Terrorist Attacks in Israel Since the Declaration of Principles at Jewish Virtual Library

November 2002 events in Asia
2002 in Israel
Mass murder in 2002
Palestinian terrorism
Murdered_Israeli_children